Two Diseases in Esperanto is a book written by  and edited by , published in Sweden in 1954. It deals with the so-called kia‑ism and tiom‑kiom‑ism in Esperanto. DeHoog recommended following the examples of the language's creator, L. L. Zamenhof, concerning Esperanto correlatives.

Rules

Kia‑ism 
The author argues:

Tiom‑kiom‑ism 
Here, the author states:

Reviews

Criticism 
In contrast to the reviews above,  criticized the reasoning of the work in a satirical article. He also suggests that de Hoog is not truly concerned with whether the language is Zamenhof's or not, but is only dissatisfied with comparisons using kia and kiom.

Another criticism came from :

References 

1954 non-fiction books
Esperanto literature